Twenty-four hours is the length of a day.

24 Hours or Twenty Four Hours may also refer to:

Film and television 
24 Hours (1931 film), a 1931 drama
24 Hours (2002 film), a Croatian anthology film
24 Hrs (film), a 2010 Malayalam language film
24 Hours (TV programme), a BBC news and current affairs series
24Hours (TV program), the name of CBWT Winnipeg's local newscast between 1970 and 2000
 "24 Hours" (ER), the pilot episode of the medical drama series ER

Music 
 24hrs (rapper) (born 1990), American singer and rapper
 Twenty Four Hours (band), an Italian rock band
 24Hours (band), a South Korean rock band
 24 Hrs (album), a 2016 album by Olly Murs
 24 Hours (The Kleptones album), 2006
 "24 Hours" (A Boogie wit da Hoodie song), 2021
 "24 Hours" (Agnes song), 2021
 "24 Hours" (Sunmi song), 2013
 "24 Hours" (TeeFlii song), 2014
 24 Hours, a 2008 album by Tom Jones
 24 Hours, a 2011 album by Richie Kotzen
 "24 Hours" (or "Twenty Four Hours"), a 1953 song by Eddie Boyd
 "24 Hours", a 1983 song by 10cc from Windows in the Jungle
 "24 Hours", a song by Cueshé
 "24 Hours", a 2007 song by Andrea Corr from Ten Feet High
 "24 Hours", a 2011 song by Gucci Mane from The Return of Mr. Zone 6
 "24 Hours", a 2013 song by Sky Ferreira from Night Time, My Time
 "Twenty Four Hours", a song by Joy Division from their 1980 album Closer
 "24 Hours", a song by Duncan Faure from the 1987 soundtrack Who's That Girl
 "24 Hours", a 2005 song by Alexz Johnson
 "24Hrs", a song by South Korean girl group Itzy from their 2020 EP It'z Me
 "Twenty Four Hours", a song by Athlete from their 2005 album Tourist

Other 
24 Hours (magazine), the previous name of Limelight, an Australian classical music and arts magazine
24 Hours (novel), a 2000 novel by Greg Iles
24 Hours (newspaper), a chain of free daily newspapers published in Canada
 24 Hours of Le Mans, the world's oldest active sports car race
 24HR Art, former name of Northern Centre for Contemporary Art, Darwin, Australia
 Twenty Four Hours (sculpture), a 1960 sculpture by Sir Anthony Caro

See also
24-hour clock

24 Heures (disambiguation)
24sata (Croatia), a Croatian newspaper
24 sata (Serbia), a newspaper from Serbia
Il Sole 24 Ore, an Italian daily business newspaper
24 Chasa, a Bulgarian newspaper
24 Horas (disambiguation)
24 Oras, a Philippine early evening newscast
24 Hours a Day (disambiguation)